Düdenköy (also: Düden) is a village in the Yeşilova District of Burdur Province in Turkey. Its population is 183 (2021).

References

Villages in Yeşilova District